is a railway station in the town of Kawanehon, Haibara District, Shizuoka Prefecture, Japan, operated by the Ōigawa Railway.

Lines

Station layout
The station has one side platform serving a single track, adjacent to a small wooden station. The station is unattended.  It retains much of the atmosphere of the early Shōwa period and is often used as a set for movies and TV dramas, including the 1975 police drama Castle of Sand.

Adjacent stations

|-
!colspan=5|Ōigawa Railway

Station history
Aobe Station was one of the original stations of the Ōigawa Main Line, and was opened on April 12, 1931.

Passenger statistics
In fiscal 2017, the station was used by an average of 5 passengers daily (boarding passengers only).

Surrounding area
Japan National Route 362

See also
 List of Railway Stations in Japan

References

External links

 Ōigawa Railway home page

Stations of Ōigawa Railway
Railway stations in Shizuoka Prefecture
Railway stations in Japan opened in 1931
Kawanehon, Shizuoka